This is a list of Japanese anniversaries and memorial days or .

These are listed by month in date order. Those excluded from the list are as follows:
 Public holidays in Japan such as New Year's Day,  National Foundation Day, etc.
 Traditional festivals such as Tanabata and Setsubun 
 Personal anniversaries (such as birthdays and wedding anniversaries)
 Anniversaries and memorial days that are only held in a certain locality
 Anniversaries created by companies or organizations to promote a product or event that were not continued or effectively were not commemorated.

Japanese anniversaries and memorial days

January

February
14 February: Valentine's Day

March
14 March: White Day
20 March: Minion Day

April
18 April:  — Japan Patent Office
20 April:  — Japan Post Holdings
23 April:

May
9 May: Goku (孫悟空) Day — established by the Japan Anniversary Association in 2015
27 May: Dragon Quest Day — established by the Japan Anniversary Association in 2018 for its impact on Japanese culture

June
5 June: 
10 June: 
23 June:  — Okinawa Prefecture

July
7 June: Tanabata (星祭り, Hoshi Matsuri, "Star Festival")
22 July: One Piece Day — established by the Japan Anniversary Association in 2017

August
14 August: Happy Summer Valentine (テニスの王子様) — established by the Japan Anniversary Association in 2018

September
13 September: Fist of the North Star (北斗の拳) Day — established by the Japan Anniversary Association in 2018

October
1 October:

November
1 November:  — established on November 1, 2008, which was the 1000th anniversary of The Tale of Genji
11 November: Pocky & Pretz Day (ポッキー＆プリッツの日, Pokkii & Purittsu no hi) — marketing event regarding Glico products Pocky and Pretz

December
1 December:  — Motion Picture Producers Association of Japan

References

Annual events in Japan
Japanese culture-related lists